is a Japanese handball player for Sony Semiconductor and the Japanese national team.

She competed at the 2015 World Women's Handball Championship in Denmark.

References

1991 births
Living people
Japanese female handball players
Place of birth missing (living people)
Asian Games medalists in handball
Handball players at the 2014 Asian Games
Asian Games silver medalists for Japan
Medalists at the 2014 Asian Games
21st-century Japanese women
20th-century Japanese women